Caine Morgan Wilkes (born July 10, 1987) is an American weightlifter. He is a three-time gold medalist in his event at the Pan American Weightlifting Championships. He also won the silver medal on three occasions. He represented the United States at the 2020 Summer Olympics in Tokyo, Japan.

Career 

He competed in the men's +105kg event at the World Weightlifting Championships in 2013, 2014 and 2015. He competed in the men's +109kg event in 2018 and 2019.

He represented the United States at the 2020 Summer Olympics in Tokyo, Japan. He competed in the men's +109 kg event. He lifted 173 kg in the Snatch and 217 kg in the Clean & Jerk for a total of 390 kg. He finished in 9th place.

He finished in 4th place in the men's +109kg event at the 2022 Pan American Weightlifting Championships held in Bogotá, Colombia. He won the bronze medal in the men's +109kg Clean & Jerk event.

Achievements

References

External links 
 

Living people
1987 births
American male weightlifters
Pan American Weightlifting Championships medalists
Weightlifters at the 2020 Summer Olympics
Olympic weightlifters of the United States
21st-century American people